Non-FIFA international football is the segment of international football that is not overseen by FIFA. FIFA is the international governing body of association football, overseeing football globally and with running international representative matches. However, some international football takes place outside its purview. This often consists of matches involving sub-national entities such as islands, colonies, or autonomous regions. Representative matches also occur involving states with limited international recognition who are unable to qualify for FIFA membership. There are also a limited number of states whose representative teams are not affiliated to FIFA. Historically, a number of competitions occurred outside FIFA's auspices. Member associations are national associations, usually affiliated to continental confederations which are subordinate to FIFA.

National teams
Broadly speaking, non-FIFA national teams can be categorised as one of the following:

States
Teams representing eight small sovereign states - the Federated States of Micronesia, Kiribati, Monaco, Nauru, Palau, Tuvalu, Marshall Islands, and the Vatican City - have played international football but are not affiliated to FIFA. Two of those states - Kiribati and Tuvalu - are Associate Members of Oceania Football Confederation, but not its parent organisation.

The United Kingdom is represented in FIFA through its four constituent countries (England, Wales, Scotland, and Northern Ireland). During the 1940s and 1950s, a United Kingdom national football team was assembled on a few occasions to play friendly matches: these are not considered full internationals by FIFA.

Autonomous (or autonomy-seeking) regions and unrecognised states
A second category encompasses regions of larger nations which have a history of autonomy. They may have already achieved a degree of self-governance (for example the autonomous communities of Spain including Catalonia, Galicia, and the Basque Country which usually play just one game a year, traditionally at Christmas), or be seeking it (like for example the historic French region of Brittany). However, it is necessary to distinguish the Basque team from the others, as it has come to represent not just the Basque autonomous community of Spain, but the greater Basque region, also incorporating Navarre and the French Basque Country.
The Republic of Srpska as a state entity with a high degree of autonomy, has ever since it was established in 1992 had its own football federation and national teams Republika Srpska national football team  who play friendly matches. The Dayton Peace Treaty recognizes it as a constitutive part of Bosnia and Herzegovina, and in 2002 both FIFA and UEFA accepted FA Republic of Srpska as one of two cofounders of FA BIH.

Alternatively, some unrecognised states may have national teams. Some established members of FIFA still fall into this category, such as Chinese Taipei. Current non-FIFA heavyweights Northern Cyprus are the best example of this category of non-FIFA football team.

Regional associations
Several teams which represent the regional associations of established footballing nations. These oversee local football in their respective regions and are part of a network of associations that contribute to the national association as a whole. A good example of this would be Jersey, who hold county status within the Football Association. These regional associations often enter representative teams into international non-FIFA matches.

Stateless people
Another group of teams are representative sides of ethnic groups that are without a home state, or are drawn from an ethnic diaspora. The Sami people of Lapland live in a distinct area of northern Fennoscandia, yet fall under the control of four states. Nevertheless, they have organised a football association and a representative team. Similarly, the Romani people—having been strewn across Europe for centuries—have a fledgeling footballing organisation to represent them in international competition. Other nations which were stateless, such as the Palestinians have been welcomed into FIFA and the AFC despite their state only more recently been recognised in international law. The Esperanto football team represents the worldwide community of Esperanto speakers.

Organizations
 COSANFF - Consejo Sudamericano de Nuevas Federaciones de Fútbol: was its first continental confederation, for South America, established in 2007. Starting from its foundation until 2013 it has been connected with NF-Board, then from 2020 it is connected with WUFA. The CSANF is currently active.
 CONIFA - Confederation of Independent Football Associations: from confederations homepage: CONIFA is a global umbrella organization for all the football teams outside FIFA. There are more than 5,500 ethnicities around the world and hundreds of sportingly isolated regions that don't have an international arena to play international football. CONIFA welcome all registered Football Associations and teams to play. We organize the official World Championship for teams outside FIFA, Continental Championships, International tournament and Cups combined with Cultural Events and Youth Exchanges. As of 2018, ConIFA has more than 40 member associations.
 IIGA - International Island Games Association: formed in 1985, this is an organization with the sole purpose to organise the Island Games, a friendly biennial athletic competition (including football) between teams from several islands and other small territories.
 UAFA - Union of Arab Football Associations: is the governing body of football in the Arab League. Established in 1974, UAFA has 22 member associations.
 WUFA - World Unity Football Alliance: from alliance's homepage: The World Unity Football Alliance is a collaborative effort between value-aligned teams with a mission to promote hope, opportunity, and universal human rights while celebrating the joy of bringing people together through the most beautiful of games: Football. Our united core values include empathy, compassion, equity, honesty, and respect for universal human rights. We work equitably together on projects, campaigns, and events that elevate the Alliance’s mission and values, and those of each of our teams. As of 2021, WUFA has 19 member associations.

Defunct
 IFU - International Football Union: a now-defunct and short lived football association established in 2009 and dissolved in 2010. It was located in Guimarães (Portugal) and was made up of teams that represent nations that were not recognized as sovereign states and which are therefore not eligible to become members of FIFA. Members of this organization were Greenland and Zanzibar.
 N.F.-Board - New Federations Board: a now-defunct football association established in 2003. It was made up of teams that represent nations that were not recognized as sovereign states and which are therefore not eligible to become members of FIFA, football's world governing body. The NF-Board organised the VIVA World Cup and the UNPO Cup. The N.F. Board has been inactive since 2013 and is considered defunct.

Non-FIFA competitions

Football tournaments at international multi-sports events, such as the Olympics, Pan-American Games and Francophone games are without FIFA's jurisdiction, but are, for the most part, operated with the acknowledgement of that body.  These events typically involve age restricted teams, to avoid direct competition with the World Cup and continental championships.

Men's tournaments

International

The FIFI Wild Cup 

The FIFI Wild Cup was organised by the German football club St. Pauli in the summer of 2006. It took place while the FIFA World Cup was being played in Germany, and aimed to raise awareness of stateless nations. Five nations took part, along with a team representing the St Pauli district of Hamburg. Northern Cyprus beat Zanzibar on penalties to win the trophy.

The UNPO Cup 

The UNPO Cup was organised by the Unrepresented Nations and Peoples Organization and NF-Board, and took place in The Hague in June 2005. The tournament, which coincided with UNPO's 7th General Assembly, featured four teams. The South Moluccas won the cup, beating Chechnya in the final. A second UNPO football cup took place in June 2017, with the Chameria team winning the tournament.

The VIVA World Cup

The first VIVA World Cup, organised by the N.F.-Board, took place in Occitania in November 2006. Six nations initially accepted invitations, but eventually, only 3 took part, the hosts, Monaco and Saami, the eventual winners. The second edition took place in Lapland in 2008 and Padania emerged as winners, as the third in 2009 where Padania won the tournament at home.

ConIFA World Football Cup 

† 2020 CONIFA World Football Cup cancelled due to COVID-19 Pandemic.

The ELF Cup

The ELF Cup, organised by the KTFF, took place in November 2006, in Northern Cyprus. Eight teams accepted invitations to take part, and the hosts emerged as winners.

Football at the Island Games

The Island Games, which are held every two years, features a competitive football tournament, won on the first two occasions by now-established UEFA and FIFA member, the Faroe Islands, and again in 2007 by now UEFA members, Gibraltar. Many of the competing nations are affiliated to larger national FAs - the Jersey Football Association, for example, is governed by the FA.

† Ynys Mon hosted an unofficial 2019 Inter Games Football Tournament as Gibraltar did not have enough pitches. Ynys Mon won the men's tournament and Isle of Man won the women's.‡ 2021 Island Games postponed until 2023 due to COVID-19 with all previously announced host moved back 2 years.

Continental

European Football Cup

The ConIFA European Football Cup was played in Douglas, the Isle of Man. The host place of the tournament was moved to London, England, and then to Székely Land, Romania. The tournament took place from 13 to 21 June 2015. It was the first ever European Championship between representative teams outside FIFA. The 12 representative teams: Ellan Vannin, County of Nice, Abkhazia, Nagorno Karabakh, South Ossetia, Occitania, Romani People, Franconia, Sapmi, Northern Cyprus, Szekely Land and Padania. Subsequently, 3 teams (Franconia, Monaco, Nagorno-Karabakh) cancelled their participation for the 2015 ConIFA European Football Cup in Hungary, which forced the originally planned schedule to be revised. The presence of a total of nine teams led to three groups of three being formed. In May 2015, Occitania also announced their withdrawal from the competition, which led to another revision of the match schedule into two groups of four, which ConIFA based upon their ranking points system. In June 2015, another three teams, South Ossetia, Abkhazia and Northern Cyprus, were all forced to withdraw, as a result of visa difficulties, while the Felvidek team was added to the line up - leaving two groups of three and six participants in total.

† 2021 CONIFA European Football Cup cancelled due to COVID-19 Pandemic.

The Europeada

The Europeada is a football tournament for indigenous and national minorities in Europe, and is organized by the Federal Union of European Nationalities. The first edition was played in 2008 in Surselva, Switzerland.

Copa CSANF

The Copa CSANF is a football tournament for football federations not admitted to FIFA in South America. Is organized by the CSANF - Consejo Sudamericano de Nuevas Federaciones. The first edition was played in 2011 in Chile.

CSANF 10th Anniversary Cup

The CSANF 10th Anniversary Cup is a third tournament to celebrate the 10 years of the creation of the CSANF - Consejo Sudamericano de Nuevas Federaciones.

Copa ANPO

The Campeonato Nacional de Futbol Pueblos Originarios (Copa ANPO) is a football tournament for the indigenous peoples of South America, and is organized by the Asociación Nacional de Pueblos Originarios. The inaugural tournament was played in 2012 in Chile. Campeonato de futbol Pueblos Originarios Asociacion Andina de Futbol  played among six teams. Three teams come from the Mapuche people – the largest indigenous population in Chile. There is a Mapuche team, a Pewenche team (which is the term used for Mapuche populations living in the mountainous regions of Chile), and a Warriache team (composed of Mapuche individuals from the city). In addition, there is one Aymara team, one Lican Antay (or Atacameño) team, and one Rapa Nui team.

The N.F.-Board's South American governing body CONMEBOLNFIFA have announced a preliminary date for the second Indigenous Peoples' Championship. Set for Santiago in Chile from August 5–10, 2013, the sides hoped to compete are Easter Island, Mapuche, Aymara, LikanAntay, Diaguita, Kolla, Quechua and a combined Yaghan-Kawesqar team.

Top level football leagues of NF-Board/Non FIFA (for club teams)
Here are some examples:
 Greenlandic Football Championship, played between club teams, is the premier football competition in Greenland. The Football Association of Greenland is not a member of FIFA or CONCACAF or UEFA.
 Challenge Prince Rainier III. The football association of Monaco is not a member of FIFA or UEFA.
 Falkland Islands Football League. The football association of the Falkland Islands is not a member of FIFA or UEFA or CONMEBOL.
 Gozo Football League First Division. The football association of Gozo is not a member of FIFA or UEFA.
 Kiribati National Championship. The football association of Kiribati is an associate member of OFC.
 Mayotte Division Honneur. The football association of Mayotte is simply associated with the French Football Federation.
 KTFF Süper Lig. The football association of Northern Cyprus is not a member of FIFA or UEFA.
 Ligue de Football de Saint Pierre et Miquelon. The football association of Saint Pierre and Miquelon is simply associated with the French Football Federation.
 Tuvalu A-Division. The football association of Tuvalu is an associate member of OFC.
 Zanzibar Premier League. The football association of Zanzibar is an associate member of CAF.
 Vatican City Championship. The football association of Vatican City is not a member of FIFA or UEFA.
 Artsakh Football League. The football association of Artsakh is not a member of FIFA or UEFA.

International competition for club
Here are some examples:
 Upton Park Trophy
 Coupe D.O.M.
 Ligue des Antilles

Other tournaments
 The Coupe de l'Outre-Mer is organised by the FFF, took place in October 2008, in Paris, France. Teams representing the eleven French Overseas Territories are allowed to participate. The first edition was won by Réunion. After 3 editions the Coupe de l’Outre-Mer, for French overseas territories, has been cancelled by the French Football Federation.
 KTFF 50th Anniversary Cup was held in 2005 under the auspices of the NF-Board, this tournament celebrated 50 years of the football association of Northern Cyprus, the KTFF, and featured representative sides from the host nation, the Sápmi, and Kosovo. Northern Cyprus triumphed in a round-robin tournament.
 Inter Island Cup played between Cocos Islands and Christmas Island in 1994, 1997, 1999, 2004 and 2005.
 Micronesia Games played by Northern Mariana Islands, Guam, Palau, Yap and Pohnpei in 1998.
 Adam Shield played between the Faroe Islands and Shetland, from 1935 to 1967.
 Micronesian Cup played between Micronesia and Northern Marianas Islands in 1999.
 Pasefika Cup played by teams composed of ethnic groups in the Pacific Ocean, is played since 2008.
 Marianas Cup played between Guam and Northern Marianas Islands from 2007.
 Clericus Cup played between sixteen Roman colleges and seminaries of the Catholic Church since 2007. Is a tournament with team from Worldwide. In 2010 the most of the athletes coming from Brazil, Colombia, Italy, Mexico, and the United States of America.
 Virgin Islands Championship played between islands of Virgin archipelago from 1997 to 2003.
 Inter Islands Competition played between Saba and Sint Eustatius in 2004 and 2006.
 Windward Islands Tournament played between St.Lucia, Grenada, Dominica and St.Vincent in 2001.
 Leeward Islands Tournament played between Caribbean islands from 1949 to 2002.
 Muratti Vase played between Guernsey, Alderney and Jersey since 1905.
 GFA Tournament played in Gibraltar, with the host, Isle of Man and Isle of Wight in 2004.
 Tournoi des Iles played in Brittany, with the host, Guadeloupe, Martinique and French Guiana in 2003.
 Greenland Cup played between Greenland, Faroe Islands and Iceland from 1980 to 1984.
 North Atlantic Cup played between Orkney, Faroe Islands and Shetland from 1968 to 1973.
 Milne Cup annual tournament between Orkney and Shetland, played since 1919.
 Martinez Shield played between Trinidad Island, Barbados and Demerara (British Guyana), from 1923 to 1933.
 Somaliland Regional Games played between Regions of Somaliland since 2011.
 Tournoi Frantz Fanon between Martinique, Guadeloupe and Haiti, played in 2002.
 Tournoi du Cinquantenaire played between French Guiana, Martinique and Guadeloupe, in 2003.
 The Four Nations played by England, Scotland and Wales with "B" teams and Gibraltar in 2008.
 Tournoi de Guadeloupe played between Guadeloupe and St.Lucia in 2006.
 Jeux Inter-Iles played between Wallis Island and Futuna Island in 2001.
 Chinese Championship played between Chinese regions, from 1973 to 1989.
 Chinese National Games played between Chinese regions, from 1959 to 1965.
 Santosh Trophy played between Indian States, since 1973.
 DONER Trophy played between the Indian States, in 2003 and 2004.
 The Southwest Cup is an open soccer tournament to Native American tribal teams in the Southwest United States. This tournament is biennial and started in 1957.
 South-West Counties Championship played between Cornwall, Guernsey and Jersey, and several other English counties from 1998 to 2007.
 Alex Oni Cup played between Igbo Nation, Edo Nation and Yoruba Nation, from 1950 to 1957.
 Brazilian State Championship played by Brazilian states from 1922 to 1987.
 Brazilian Native Peoples Games are held under the auspices of FUNAI.
 International Small Nations Tournament played by Jersey, Gibraltar and Madeira (U-20 team) in Jersey in 2008.
 2010 Corsica Football Cup - played 4 teams: 2 non-FIFA and 2 FIFA.
 The Eco-Sys Action Cup (EAFC) - playing for the planet.
 The International tournament of peoples and cultures in Marseille (France) from 23 to 28 June 2013. International Soccer Tournament is part of Marseille European City of Culture 2013. 6-12 Men's senior teams will vie for honours while sharing a cultural experience with their opponents.
 Tynwald Hill International Football Tournament The first Tynwald Hill International Football Tournament to be held at Mullen e Cloie, St Johns, Isle of Man from the 4 to 7 July 2013. Competing Teams - Sealand, Alderney, Tamil Eelam, Raetia, Occitania and St Johns United.
 1st Copa America for Pueblos Originarios will be held in Colombia in 2014.
 All Hazara tournament played between Hazara nation in Pakistan.
 The Cup of the SADR (Sahrawi Arab Democratic Republic) -  a new edition of the Saharawi Soccer Cup with players who live in forced exile in Spain and in France participate.
 Southern Frontier Cup a 4-team invitational tournament hosted by International Surrey Football, in Surrey, United Kingdom.
 WUFA World Series, organised by the World Unity Football Alliance, first stage held in Surrey, United Kingdom, with subsequent stages planned.

Some non-FIFA teams play in other tournaments generally played by FIFA members, including the CONCACAF Gold Cup, Indian Ocean Games, CECAFA Cup, South Pacific Games, Coupes des Caraibes, Shell Caribbean Cup, CFU Championship and many more.

Moreover, many teams, before obtaining FIFA membership, played friendlies and international tournaments - for example, the Faroe Islands.

Women Tournaments
Across a discreet number of minor tournaments, the only three main international football tournaments for women are the Women's VIVA World Cup, the Europeada and the Island Games.

Island Games

A women's football tournament to the Island Games is played from 2001 edition:

† Ynys Mon hosted an unofficial 2019 Inter Games Football Tournament as Gibraltar did not have enough pitches.‡ 2021 Island Games postponed until 2023 due to COVID-19 with all previously announced host moved back 2 years.

VIVA World Cup

A women's football tournament to the VIVA World Cup is played from 2008 until 2010:

CONFIA Women's World Football Cup

A women's football tournament to the CONIFA Women's World Football Cup is played from 2022.

The Europeada
A women's football tournament to the Europeada is played from the 2016 edition:

Youth Tournaments
A big number of friendlies are being played between youth selections with different restrictions (U-21, U-18, or U-16 for example) but still there are not any international or continental tournaments being held. Only a little number of minor tournaments are played for youth selections: one of them, and probably one of the most important, is Muratti Vase who is played for U-21, U-18, U-15.

Club Tournaments
Despite the fact many non-FIFA associations have their own league, there are no international or continental club tournaments.

See also
 List of men's national association football teams
 UEFA Regions' Cup

References

External links
 Non-FIFA Football Updates
 Non-FIFA Cups on RSSSF
 Island Games on RSSSF
 UEFA Regions' Cup on RSSSF
 Outcasts! The Lands That FIFA Forgot

National and official selection-teams not affiliated to FIFA